In mathematics, an ultragraph C*-algebra is a universal C*-algebra generated by partial isometries on a collection of Hilbert spaces constructed from the ultragraphpg 6-7. These C*-algebras were created in order to simultaneously generalize the classes of graph C*-algebras and Exel–Laca algebras, giving a unified framework for studying these objects. This is because every graph can be encoded as an ultragraph, and similarly, every infinite graph giving an Exel-Laca algebras can also be encoded as an ultragraph.

Definitions

Ultragraphs 
An ultragraph  consists of a set of vertices , a set of edges , a source map , and a range map  taking values in the power set collection  of nonempty subsets of the vertex set.  A directed graph is the special case of an ultragraph in which the range of each edge is a singleton, and ultragraphs may be thought of as generalized directed graph in which each edges starts at a single vertex and points to a nonempty subset of vertices.

Example 

An easy way to visualize an ultragraph is to consider a directed graph with a set of labelled vertices, where each label corresponds to a subset in the image of an element of the range map. For example, given an ultragraph with vertices and edge labels, with source an range mapscan be visualized as the image on the right.

Ultragraph algebras 
Given an ultragraph , we define  to be the smallest subset of  containing the singleton sets , containing the range sets , and closed under intersections, unions, and relative complements. A Cuntz–Krieger -family is a collection of projections   together with a collection of partial isometries  with mutually orthogonal ranges satisfying

  for all ,
  whenever  is a vertex that emits a finite number of edges, and
  for all .

The ultragraph C*-algebra  is the universal C*-algebra generated by a Cuntz–Krieger -family.

Properties 
It can be shown that  is isomorphic to the Exel–Laca algebra .

Ultragraph C*-algebras are useful tools for studying both graph C*-algebras and Exel–Laca algebras.  Among other benefits, modeling an Exel–Laca algebra as ultragraph C*-algebra allows one to use the ultragraph as a tool to study the associated C*-algebras, thereby providing the option to use graph-theoretic techniques, rather than matrix techniques, when studying the Exel–Laca algebra. Ultragraph C*-algebras have been used to show that every simple AF-algebra is isomorphic to either a graph C*-algebra or an Exel–Laca algebra.  They have also been used to prove that every AF-algebra with no (nonzero) finite-dimensional quotient is isomorphic to an Exel–Laca algebra.  

While the classes of graph C*-algebras, Exel–Laca algebras, and ultragraph C*-algebras each contain C*-algebras not isomorphic to any C*-algebra in the other two classes, the three classes have been shown to coincide up to Morita equivalence.

See also 

 Leavitt path algebra
 Exel–Laca algebras
 Infinite matrix
 Infinite graph

Notes

C*-algebras
Graph theory